Serge Van Cottom (born 5 February 1953) is a Belgian weightlifter. He competed in the men's light heavyweight event at the 1980 Summer Olympics.

References

External links
 

1953 births
Living people
Belgian male weightlifters
Olympic weightlifters of Belgium
Weightlifters at the 1980 Summer Olympics
People from Uccle
Sportspeople from Brussels